Glymur is the second-highest waterfall in Iceland, with a cascade of 198 m. It was long regarded as the tallest until being surpassed by Morsárfoss, a newly measured waterfall near Morsárjökull in 2011.

It is situated at the rear end of the Hvalfjörður. Since the opening of the Hvalfjörður Tunnel under this fjord, visitor numbers have dropped.

The river Botnsá  runs from the Hvalvatn lake and after a short distance the water falls down alongside the Hvalfell mountain into a steep canyon. The waterfall can be accessed from a parking area at the end of the road. Hikers can view the waterfall from marked paths on the east side of the river Botnsá.

Gallery 

Second picture is an engraving showing people trying to escape from a monster whale. It is an illustration to the Icelandic legend of Redhead (Rauðhöfði ) which is said to be the cause of formation of Glymur.

See also
 List of waterfalls
 Waterfalls of Iceland

References

External links

Information

Waterfalls of Iceland